Arlette Racineux (born 2 March 1961) is a French wheelchair tennis player, she plays left-handed. Racineux is a two time bronze medalist in the Summer Paralympics; she won her first bronze medal in 1996 with Oristelle Marx and won her second bronze medal with Florence Gravellier.

References

External links 
 

1961 births
Living people
French female tennis players
Wheelchair tennis players
Paralympic wheelchair tennis players of France
Paralympic bronze medalists for France
Paralympic medalists in wheelchair tennis
Medalists at the 1996 Summer Paralympics
Medalists at the 2008 Summer Paralympics
Wheelchair tennis players at the 1992 Summer Paralympics
Wheelchair tennis players at the 1996 Summer Paralympics
Wheelchair tennis players at the 2000 Summer Paralympics
Wheelchair tennis players at the 2004 Summer Paralympics
Wheelchair tennis players at the 2008 Summer Paralympics
20th-century French women
21st-century French women